Patrik Brundin (born December 26, 1961 in Malmö, Sweden) is director of the Center for Neurodegenerative Science and Jay Van Andel Endowed Chair at Van Andel Research Institute in Grand Rapids, Michigan and a leading Parkinson's disease researcher. He was part of the team that conducted the first cell transplant surgeries designed to restore lost dopamine-producing cells in Parkinson's disease, documented by J. William Langston in the book The Case of the Frozen Addicts. Brundin has authored or co-authored some 350 peer-reviewed articles in the field of neurology, most of which are on Parkinson's disease and related disorders.

He was previously Professor of Neuroscience at Lund University in Sweden. He is a member of the Oxford Parkinson's Disease Centre scientific advisory board  and editor-in-chief of the Journal of Parkinson's Disease.

He performed his doctoral studies with the Swedish neuroscientist Anders Björklund and received his MD and PhD at Lund University in 1992. He received his international baccalaureate from the United World College of the Atlantic in 1980.

References

Living people
1961 births
People educated at Atlantic College
People educated at a United World College
American neurologists
Swedish neurologists
Lund University alumni
Swedish neuroscientists
American medical researchers
Parkinson's disease researchers